Phractura intermedia is a species of catfish in the genus Phractura. It is found in coastal rivers in Africa from the Nyong River to the Kouilou River. It has a length of 9.5 cm.

References 

intermedia
Freshwater fish of Africa
Fish described in 1902
Taxa named by George Albert Boulenger